Kristien Van Vaerenbergh (born 22 April 1978 in Halle, Flemish Brabant) is a Belgian politician and is affiliated to the N-VA. She was elected as a member of the Belgian Chamber of Representatives in 2010.

In addition to her work in parliament, Van Vaerenbergh has been a member of the Belgian delegation to the Parliamentary Assembly of the Council of Europe (PACE) since 2010. As member of N-VA, she is part of the ECR. She currently serves as member of the Committee on Legal Affairs and Human Rights and the Sub-Committee on Human Rights.

Notes

1978 births
Living people
People from Halle, Belgium
New Flemish Alliance politicians
Members of the Chamber of Representatives (Belgium)
21st-century Belgian politicians
21st-century Belgian women politicians